Godfried Kportufe Agama (August 1933 – August 5, 2009) was a Ghanaian economist and a governor of the Bank of Ghana. He held the record to date for being the longest-serving governor of the bank.

References

Governors of Bank of Ghana
Ghanaian economists
Mfantsipim School alumni
1933 births
2009 deaths